Ethane-1,2-dithiol, also known as EDT, is a colorless liquid with the formula CH(SH). It has a very characteristic odor which is compared by many people to rotten cabbage. It is a common building block in organic synthesis and an excellent ligand for metal ions.

Preparation
Ethane-1,2-dithiol is  made commercially by the reaction of 1,2-dichloroethane with aqueous sodium bisulfide. In the laboratory, it can also be prepared by the action of 1,2-dibromoethane on thiourea followed by hydrolysis.

Applications
As a 1,2-dithiol, this compound is widely used in organic chemistry because it reacts with aldehydes and ketones to give 1,3-dithiolanes, which are useful intermediates.

CH(SH) + RR'CO → CHSCRR' + HO

Other 1,2- and 1,3-dithiols undergo this reaction to give related 1,3-dithiolanes and 1,3-dithianes (six-membered rings). Diols such as ethylene glycol undergo analogous reactions to 1,3-dioxolanes and 1,3-dioxanes.  One distinguishing feature of the dithiolanes and dithianes derived from aldehydes is that the methyne group can be deprotonated and the resulting carbanion alkylated.

1,2-Ethanedithiol is commonly used as a scavenger in peptide cleavage synthesis.

See also 
Ethane-1,1-dithiol

References

Thiols
Reagents for organic chemistry
Chelating agents
Foul-smelling chemicals